"Parce que tu crois" (English translation: "Because You Believe") is a song by Armenian-French singer Charles Aznavour. It was released on his 1966 albums La bohème and Chante Paris au mois d'août.

Use as sample 
The song has been sampled or interpolated by numerous music artists including:

Youssou N'Dour on "Xale Rewmi" (1985)
Dr. Dre on "What's the Difference" (feat. Eminem and Xzibit) (1999)
Blu Cantrell on "Breathe" (feat. Sean Paul) (2003) in turn interpolated What's The Difference.
Wax Tailor on "Positively Inclined" (2003)
Bitter:Sweet on "Dirty Laundry" (2006)
Debout sur le Zinc in the album "Les promesses" (2006)
Koxie on "Garçon" (2007)
Indila on "Dernière danse" (2013)
Cro on "Bad Chick" (2014)
Nikki Yanofsky on "Necessary Evil" (2014)
Miles Kane on "Johanna" (soundtrack to the movie Mortdecai) (2015)
 Emancipator on "Time for Space" (2017)
Shaq on "Freestyle (Dame Dolla Diss)" (2019)

Notes

External links
 

1966 songs
Charles Aznavour songs
Demis Roussos songs
Songs written by Charles Aznavour